Campoo (formally Campoo-Los Valles) is a comarca of Cantabria (Spain) located in the High Ebro, with a surface little bigger than 1,000 km2, and including the municipalities of Hermandad de Campoo de Suso, Campoo de Enmedio, Campoo de Yuso, Valdeolea, Valdeprado del Río, Valderredible, Reinosa, Las Rozas de Valdearroyo, Santiurde de Reinosa, Pesquera, and San Miguel de Aguayo. Their inhabitants are called Campurrians (Campurrianos, in Spanish).
Its highest elevation is the Cuchillón peak (2,225 m above sea level), and the lowest is Pesquera (560 m), with the capital, Reinosa at 850 m.

Originally, as it is gathered in the Book of Merindades of Castile (from circa 1352), the Merindad of Aguilar de Campoo comprised municipalities of the south of present Cantabria, as well as of northern Province of Palencia and Burgos, with its capital being the Palentine Aguilar de Campoo, ancient capital also of the vast Marquesse of Aguilar de Campoo. Later the capital was moved to Reinosa, which still has this status. The "Palentine Campoo" was left, after the provincial division, with Aguilar as the most important township, and included nowadays into the large comarca of Palentine Mountains.

Geography

Campoo is placed in a transition zone between the Eurosiberian and the Mediterranean regions of the Iberian Peninsula (see Forests of the Iberian Peninsula). Its climate is generally cold and humid, influenced by the Continental (as it is open to the Meseta) and Oceanic climates, the last one smoothed by the Ísar ranges and the Cantabrian Mountains. This climate combination can be observed in very cold winters and gentle summers, with no extreme temperatures. With Reinosa in the middle, we can find a more Mediterranean zone, comprising Valderredible and Valdeolea, and to the North, near the end of the Besaya River, the climate becomes clearly Oceanic.

In the Híjar mountains is the source of the river of the same name, whose discharge is the main water contribution to the Ebro river, which is born in the locality of Fontibre. This river is dammed near Reinosa, to make one of the largest reservoirs of the hydrographic basin of the Ebro, acting as main regulator of the Navarre and Riojan irrigated lands. In these same mountain ranges, risen from tectonic movements during the time from the end of the Cretaceous to the Oligocene (alpinotype orogeny), are the highest peaks of the comarca, the Cuchillón (2,225 m) and the Tres Mares (Three Seas; 2,180 m), so called because from its skirts rivers flow to all three Spanish river basins.

The Tres Mares is the point where the mountain ranges of Ísar and Híjar start, forming at its base a glacial valley open to the whole comarca. From its summits can be seen the Bay of Biscay to the north, the near Picos de Europa to the northwest, the Cantabrian and Palentine Mountains to the southwest, the Meseta Central to the south, and the Pas valleys with the Encartaciones mountains to the east.

Flora and fauna

In the northern slope of the mountains, beech and oak groves of the Saja-Besaya Natural Park spread out; an important nature reserve abundant with red deer, roe deer and golden eagles. The presence of Iberian wolves is not very rare, and brown bears have been sighted, thus considering this zone as an important nexus of communication between isolated populations of this plantigrade. There are also important colonies of griffon vultures in Polientes and the Híjar ridges. Other interesting species of animals that populate the comarca are: eagle owls, martens, badgers, stoats and desmans. In addition, the Ebro swamps house a remarkable aquatic avifauna.
Among its flora, as well as the mentioned oak and beech groves, there are very important populations of hollies and birches, and also excellent specimens of taxus, all of which are protected by the Spanish law.

People
The inhabitants of Campoo are called Campurrians (Campurrianos in Spanish) and their language is Spanish, influenced by an Astur-Leonese dialect.

The traditional costume is characteristic for its "albarcas", footwear similar to Asturian clogs, which are exquisitely carved in birch wood (nowadays they are industrially made in beech). Another typical Campurrian accessory is the "palo pinto", a rod made of hazelnut tree wood and engraved by fire, and which is used to help in walking up the mountains and to beat the livestock.

The Campurrian economy has traditionally been connected to cattle, the Campurrians having also good reputation as carters and masons. The Campurrian carters were in charge of making the exchange of merchandising between the Castilian Mesa and the capital of the province (until the administrative reorganization of 1982, Santander was part of Old Castile, and also its capital), constantly redoing the route of the Foramontanos that repopulated Castile.

Culture
The day of Campoo is celebrated the last Sunday of September, as part of Saint Matthew festivities. The main act of the day is a cart parade that show scenes of the traditional everyday life, pulled by oxen and Tudanca cows. Other important festivities are the ones of Los Campanos in Abiada, celebrated the first Sunday of September to commemorate the end of summer by bringing the cows down to the valley from the summer passes, full of regalia; and Las Nieves on August 15 in Naveda.

In the comarca there are plentiful buildings of "highlander" romanesque architecture, among which the Cervatos's and San Martín de Elines'''s collegiate churches, the Santa María la Mayor church of Villacantid stand out; other remarkable churches are those of Bolmir y Retortillo, San Andrés and San Martín de Valdelomar.

In the Campurrian civil architecture the abundant noble houses stand out, with carved ashlars and sunny spots (Mazandrero, Naveda, Celada, Pesquera, etc.) In military architecture one piece must be remarked, the Argüeso castle, built on the 12th century and where Don Íñigo López de Mendoza, Marquis of Santillana, lived and from where he managed the Lordship of Campoo and his marquessate of Argüeso in the 15th century. Other interesting buildings are the tower of the Bustamantes in the Costana, and also the ones of Ruerrero, of San Martín de Hoyos, of Ríos de Proaño, and the tower of the Gómez-Bárcenas in San Miguel de Aguayo.

The city of Julióbriga ruins, 4 km away from Reinosa, in Retortillo, deserve a special mention. The city was founded by the IV Roman Legion in the 1st century BC upon an old Cantabrian castro. Also, an important battle took place in this area: the Battle of Aracillum (Aradillos), and important chapter in the romanization of Cantabria, which took over 200 years, one of the longest of the whole history of the Roman Empire.
The comarca of Campoo was again important in another war episode two thousand years later, during the Spanish Civil War, when the Navarre Brigades broke the resistance of the Popular Front in the Híjar ridges, provoking the republican loss of Santander.

Present time
Halfway during the 1970s, the comarca underwent a depopulation and demographic ageing process, specially due to the decline of the national company "La Naval" (Forges and Steels of Reinosa), which maintained a previously thriving industry, with credited international prestige in naval and weaponry construction. Notwithstanding, after a traumatic industrial conversion and an important development in tourism, this Cantabrian comarca'' faces the rade-off between keeping the highly polluting siderurgy or basing its economy on tourism.

Nowadays, its main economic resources are the aforementioned tourism and siderurgy industry, as well as the alimentary livestock (specially cattle, but also horses). The growing development of the tourism infrastructure, in spite of being one of the main economic engines of Campoo, is starting to make pressure in the ecologic balance of the zone. This fact has caused the proliferation of ecologist associations involved in the achievement of sustainable development, as the only way to preserve these valleys.

See also
Alto Campoo ski station

Bibliography

General
Enciclopedia Universal Ilustrada Espasa.
Menéndez-Pidal, Ramón. Historia de España. Ramón Menéndez Pidal / Madrid : Espasa-Calpe, 1989
Pérez de Urbel, Justo. La España del siglo X : castellanos. y leoneses, navarros y gallegos, musulmanes y judíos, forjadores de historia / Madrid, Alonso, 1983
Sánchez-Albornoz, Claudio. España : Un enigma histórico / Barcelona, Edhasa, D. L. 2001

Monographic
El Conde Fernán González. Fray Justo Pérez de Urbel.
Fueros de Brañosera dados por el conde Muñio Nuñez en 15 de octubre del año de 824. MyR. 16-18.
Iglesias, J. M. Regio Cantabrorum. / Santander, Caja Cantabria. Oct.1999
Muñíz, Juan A. Cántabros. La génesis de un pueblo. / Santander, Caja Cantabria.

External links
The House of Culture "Sánchez Díaz" of Reinosa has been publishing in paper the series "Notebooks of Campoo" from 1995; a rigorous and well documented work about the most diverse aspects of Campoo, and written by experts in different matters. Recently this notebooks have been digitalized and uploaded to the Internet. Some of them can be read in the following links:

 Notebooks of Campoo
 The destruction of the archives
 Mountains of Campoo
 Medieval towers
 The Foramontans
 La Naval of Reinosa

Other
 Government of Cantabria
 Palencia Tourism
 Cantabria 102 municipalities
 SideNor (Siderurgy of the North)
 CanTur(Cantabrian Tourism)

References

Comarcas of Cantabria
Green Spain